British American Racing (BAR) was a Formula One constructor that competed in the sport from 1999 to 2005. BAR began by acquiring Tyrrell, and used Supertec engines for their first year. Subsequently, they formed a partnership with Honda which lasted for the next six years.

The team was named after British American Tobacco plc (BAT), which owned and sponsored it in order to display its Lucky Strike and 555 brands. The headquarters were in Brackley, Northamptonshire, United Kingdom.

In mid-November 2004, Japanese automobile manufacturer Honda purchased 45% of the team, and in September 2005, purchased the remaining 55% share to become the sole owner. Consequently, BAR Honda became Honda Racing F1 Team for the 2006 Formula One season. BAT continued as title sponsor with the Lucky Strike brand, but due to new tobacco advertising regulations worldwide, pulled its sponsorship from Formula One entirely at the end of the 2006 season.

Honda ran the team for the 2006, 2007 and 2008 seasons. During 2008, the Honda RA109 was being developed for the following year while Honda attempted to sell the team. A management buy-out by team principal Ross Brawn and an engine supply deal with Mercedes-Benz resulted in a remarkable 2009 season in which Brawn GP team won the Constructors' Championship with Jenson Button winning the Drivers' Championship.

History 
British American Tobacco (BAT) had been involved in Formula One for many years, with several of its brands being displayed on F1 cars run by various teams.

In 1997, the corporation was convinced by Craig Pollock to provide most of the equity to purchase the Tyrrell Formula One team for £30 million. Pollock, Adrian Reynard and Rick Gorne were the minority partners. The deal was announced on 2 December 1997. The team was still officially known as Tyrrell in 1998, before it became BAR the following year.

Preparations 
On 23 July 1998, BAR announced the signing of 1997 World Champion Jacques Villeneuve away from Williams with a lucrative contract for the 1999 season. Pollock had managed Villeneuve throughout his racing career. Villeneuve was joined by F1 rookie Ricardo Zonta. The car's chassis was built by Reynard Motorsport at a new factory in Brackley and was powered by Supertec (rebadged Renault) engines.

At the launch of their new car, BAR unveiled separate liveries for their cars; Villeneuve's car painted in a white and red Lucky Strike livery and Zonta's carrying a blue and yellow 555 livery. The FIA deemed the dual liveries illegal under F1 regulations which state that a team's cars must carry largely identical liveries. BAR lodged a complaint with the International Chamber of Commerce (as permitted under F1's regulations) but simultaneously lodged a complaint with the European Commission. Pollock was summoned to the World Motor Sport Council to explain the team's behaviour. A potential fine and/or ban was averted when Pollock agreed to abide by the F1 arbitration process, admitted that in filing the complaint to the EC his lawyers had acted independently and that declarations made in the claim did not reflect his personal views. He also apologised to the Council and reiterated his acceptance of the FIA's authority. To get around the ban, BAR ran one side of their cars painted in the Lucky Strike colours, and the other side in the blue and yellow of 555. BAR reverted to a more traditional style of livery for 2000 onwards.

BAR had the slogan of "A tradition of excellence", which was viewed as humorous by pundits as the team had no history and therefore no such tradition at all. Adrian Reynard also made an ambitious claim that the team would win a race in their debut season.

1999

In a disastrous maiden season, BAR failed to score a single point in the Constructors' Championship. The car was relatively quick and often qualified in the midfield, as seen especially in the Spanish Grand Prix, where Villeneuve had briefly run in 3rd place ahead of the Ferraris before pitting in.

However, the car suffered from chronic reliability issues, resulting in many instances of the car failing to finish the race. This was especially the case of Villeneuve, who started the season with 11 straight retirements before his first race finish of the season at Belgium, only to twice more fail to finish the race in the European and Malaysian Grands Prix later on.

Zonta sustained an injury during practice for the Brazilian Grand Prix and was unable to participate in qualifying for the race. He was also forced to miss out on the next three races due to that injury. Mika Salo, who filled in for Zonta in those three races, provided the team with its season best finish of 7th at San Marino (although Salo himself did not reach the chequered flag at the end of the race).

2000

During the 1999 season, BAR announced that Honda had become their engine supplier beginning in 2000. The Honda deal not only meant they would supply engines, but that Honda staff would work with the team at their Brackley base as well as received full-factory support from Honda including official team vehicles and free engines. Honda had planned to enter Formula One as a factory team, but relented. It was the first time Honda had been directly involved in Formula One since 1992. BAR did not have exclusive use of Honda engines though, as Jordan Grand Prix also used Mugen Honda power units. The following year, Jordan were given factory Honda engines, but the engine manufacturers could not supply two teams forever. This prompted a battle between BAR and Jordan for the use of Honda engines in the long term.

The car was once again designed in co-operation with Adrian Reynard despite talk of tension between him and team principal Craig Pollock. At the launch of the 002 car, Pollock himself described the 2000 season as a chance to "wipe the slate clean" following their awful first season and admitted that the team had made many mistakes in their first season.

In 2000, the new Honda powered BAR did show a significant improvement. It proved to be considerably more reliable than the team's previous effort, but the team still only had a best finish of 4th and the victory they had promised in 1999 still eluded them. At the end of the season, the team finished 5th in the Constructors' Championship. The progression and improvement of the team was enough to convince Villeneuve to remain at the team.

2001

Villeneuve reached the podium twice in 2001 for BAR, but neither he nor his new teammate Olivier Panis's results were consistent enough.

2002
Under pressure from British American Tobacco, Pollock resigned on the eve of the launch of the 2002 car and was replaced as team principal by David Richards. Richards' Prodrive company was also awarded a five-year management contract to run BAR. BAT and Prodrive had a prior relationship with BAT sponsoring Subaru's World Rally Championship team, operated by Prodrive.

2002 was a transient season for BAR. A significant proportion of the workforce was culled while technical director Malcolm Oastler and designer Andy Green left. Villeneuve still struggled to score points and Panis also failing to reach expectations. BAR signed a deal to become Honda's only team in 2003, despite finishing behind Honda's other team, Jordan, in both 2001 and 2002.

2003

BAR brought in Jenson Button to replace Panis for the 2003 Formula One season. Villeneuve's contract negotiation arguments with David Richards eventually ended with him being replaced before the end of the season by Japanese driver Takuma Sato. Honda has traditionally liked its teams to field Japanese drivers for publicity reasons in its home country. Jenson Button led a race for the first time at the 2003 United States Grand Prix. The team struggled due to its use of Bridgestone tyres. In the off-season they changed to rival company Michelin.

Peak in 2004 
Early in 2004, the team saw a further upswing in its fortunes, Button scoring many podium finishes. He also took their first pole position at San Marino.  BAR finished the season in 2nd place in the Constructors' Championship, beating every team except for Ferrari. Despite this, BAR's first win still eluded them.

During the course of the 2004 season, a dispute with WilliamsF1 threatened to overshadow BAR's on-track performance. Both teams believed they had a valid contract for Button in 2005. The issue finally went to the Contract Recognition Board, which found in favour of BAR. Button was to drive for BAR in 2005, but signed a contract to join Williams for 2006.

With increasing restrictions being placed upon tobacco companies' opportunities to advertise in Formula One, rumours suggested that BAT would try to sell the team. In mid-November 2004, BAR announced that Honda had purchased 45% and, as part of the deal, David Richards left to be replaced by Nick Fry as team principal. Prodrive's management contract was also terminated early.

2005: Poor start and controversy 

The start of the 2005 season didn't go according to plan for BAR, as they struggled in the "flyaway" races at the start of the season. Just as they became competitive in San Marino, BAR Honda was disqualified for running with illegal cars. The allegation was that the cars were able to race with their total weight below 605 kg (1323 lb), the minimum weight required for a Formula 1 car. Their interpretation of the rules was that this limit applies only during the race, not during the post-race scrutineering. The FIA, and later the court, disagreed. In addition to the disqualification, the team was banned for two races, a period which included the lucrative Monaco Grand Prix. The team initially indicated that they planned to fight the decision before a regular civil court but later decided to accept the verdict. Max Mosley, the president of the FIA, saw the sanction as very lenient; he had wanted the team to be banned for the rest of the season. However, they were unable to prove deliberate intent to cheat as they had with BAR's predecessor, Tyrrell, in the 1984 season.

When BAR returned at the European Grand Prix, the team struggled to find its feet. In stark contrast to the previous season, BAR failed to score a single point until the midway point, at the 2005 French Grand Prix, not helped by the team's use of Michelin tyres causing them to not start the 2005 United States Grand Prix. Takuma Sato had a particularly poor season, scoring just one point, and subsequently, his contract was not renewed by BAR at the end of the season. Sato was replaced in the new Honda team by former Ferrari driver Rubens Barrichello. Button scored in each of the last 10 races of the season, culminating in 2 podium positions. Confirmation of this improvement was shown in a skillful pass made by Jenson Button, overtaking Jacques Villeneuve at the fast Pouhon corner at Spa-Francorchamps, in the rain, and around the outside.

At the end of 2005, Honda obtained 100% ownership of BAR from British American Tobacco, completing their ambition to become a full F1 manufacturer team. In addition, Jenson Button's Williams contract was bought out for US$30 million, and Button signed a multi-year contract with Honda.

Following the sale of the team to Honda, BAT would return to Formula One in  sponsoring McLaren in a "global partnership" agreement under its A Better Tomorrow campaign, relating to electronic cigarettes and related alternative smoking products.

Complete Formula One results
(key)

Notes
 – The driver did not finish the Grand Prix, but was classified, as he completed over 90% of the race distance.

Speed record attempt 
BAR tested a modified BAR-Honda 007 car, which they intended to use in an attempt to set the land speed record for a car meeting FIA Formula One regulations. The driver for this project was Alan van der Merwe. However, these tests did not constitute the record attempt itself and waterlogging of the salt flats resulted in the attempt being postponed. The chassis was used by BAR's successor, Honda, to set a new record the following year.

References

External links

Bonneville 400 website (Defunct link)

Formula One constructors
Formula One entrants
British auto racing teams
British racecar constructors
British American Tobacco
Auto racing teams established in 1999
Auto racing teams disestablished in 2005
1999 establishments in the United Kingdom
2005 disestablishments in the United Kingdom